The Harold W. and Evelyn Burton House, at 2195 East Walker Lane in Holladay, Utah, United States, is a listed property on the National Register of Historic Places. A mansion built in 1923 as the home for architect Harold W. Burton, it was listed in 2017. Significant contributing property includes a 1923 two-car garage.

References

External links

Houses completed in 1923
National Register of Historic Places in Salt Lake County, Utah